John Elwes [né Meggot or Meggott] MP (7 April 1714 – 26 November 1789) was a member of parliament (MP) in Great Britain for Berkshire (1772–1784) and an eccentric miser, suggested to be an inspiration for the character of Ebenezer Scrooge in Charles Dickens' A Christmas Carol. Dickens made reference to Elwes some years later in his last completed novel, Our Mutual Friend. Elwes was also believed to inspire William Harrison Ainsworth to create the character of John Scarfe in his novel The Miser's Daughter.

Family background and early life
Elwes (birth name "Meggot") was born on 7 April 1714 into a respectable English family. His father, Robert Meggot, was a respected Southwark brewer and his grandfather was Sir George Meggot, MP for that same borough. His mother, Amy (née Elwes), was the granddaughter of Sir Gervase Elwes, 1st Baronet and MP for Suffolk (see Elwes baronets). His maternal grandmother, Lady Isabella Hervey (of the Hervey family), happened to be a celebrated miser.

He received a good education in the classics at Westminster School. After leaving, he travelled to Geneva where he embraced his skill for horsemanship and love of the hunt. He was known as one of the best riders in Europe. It was at this time that he was introduced to Voltaire, to whom he was reported to bear a remarkable resemblance. However, Elwes was far more impressed with the quality of the horses at his riding school than by the genius of the French philosopher.

First inheritance
Elwes inherited his first fortune from his father who died in 1718 when Elwes was just four years old. Although his mother was left £100,000 in the will (approx. £8,000,000 as of 2010), she reputedly starved herself to death because she was too cheap to spend it. With her death, he inherited the family estate including Marcham Park at Marcham in Berkshire (now Oxfordshire), purchased by his father in 1717.

Second inheritance
The greatest influence on Elwes' life was his miserly uncle, Sir Hervey Elwes, 2nd Baronet, of Stoke College and MP for Sudbury, whom Elwes obsequiously imitated to gain favour. Sir Hervey prided himself on only spending little more than £110 on himself per annum. The two of them would spend the evening railing against other people's extravagances while they shared a single glass of wine. In 1751, in order to inherit his uncle's estate, he changed his name from Meggot to Elwes. Sir Hervey died on 18 September 1763, bequeathing his entire fortune to his nephew. The net worth of the estate was more than £250,000 (approx. £18,000,000 as of 2010), a figure that continued to grow despite Elwes' inept handling of his finances.

Miserliness

On assuming his uncle's fortune, however, Elwes also adopted his uncle's miserly ways. He went to bed when darkness fell so as to save on candles. He began wearing only ragged clothes, including a beggar's cast-off wig he found in a hedge and wore for two weeks. His clothes were so dilapidated that many mistook him for a common street beggar, and would put a penny into his hand as they passed. To avoid paying for a coach he would walk in the rain, and then sit in wet clothes to save the cost of a fire to dry them. His house was full of expensive furniture but also moulding food. He would eat putrefied game before allowing new food to be bought. On one occasion, it was said that he ate a moorhen that a rat had pulled from a river. Rather than spend the money for repairs he allowed his spacious country mansion to become uninhabitable. A near relative once stayed at his home in the country, but the bedroom was in such a poor state that the relative was awakened in the night by rain pouring on him through the roof. After searching in vain for a bell, the relative was forced to move his bed several times, until he found a place where he could remain dry. On remarking the circumstance to Elwes in the morning, the latter said: "Ay! I don't mind it myself... that is a nice corner in the rain!" His biographer, Edward Topham, who knew him well, recounted:
"it is curious to remark, how he contrived to mingle small attempts at saving.... After sitting up a whole night at play for thousands, with the most fashionable and profligate men of the time, amidst splendid rooms, gilt sofas, wax lights, and waiters attendant on his call, he would walk out about four in the morning, not towards home, but into Smithfield! to meet his own cattle, which were coming to market from Theydon-hall, a farm of his in Essex. There would this same man, forgetful of the scenes he had just left, stand in the cold or rain, bartering with a carcass butcher for a shilling."

According to author William Haig Miller, Elwes "complained bitterly of the birds robbing him of so much hay with which to build their nests."
Even Elwes' health was limited by expense. In common with many misers, he distrusted physicians, preferring to treat himself in order to save paying for one. He once badly cut both legs while walking home in the dark, but would only allow the apothecary to treat one, wagering his fee that the untreated limb would heal first. Elwes won by a fortnight and the doctor had to forfeit his fee. He also bore a wound from a hunting accident. Legend has it that one day he was out shooting with a gentleman who was a particularly bad shot. This same man accidentally fired through a hedge, lodging several shot in the miser's cheek. With great embarrassment and concern, the gentleman approached Elwes to apologize, but Elwes, anticipating the apology, held out his hand, and said: "My dear sir, I congratulate you on improving; I thought you would hit something in time".

Political career
In 1772, with the help of Lord Craven he became a Member of Parliament for Berkshire (his election expenses amounted to a mere eighteen pence). He entered the House of Commons in a by-election as a compromise candidate to replace Thomas Craven, which began the first of three terms. He held his seat unopposed until he stood down at the 1784 election. Elwes sat with either party according to his whim, and he never once rose to address the House of Commons. Fellow members mockingly observed that since he possessed only one suit, they could never accuse him of being a "turncoat". Being a member of parliament did, however, cause Elwes to frequently travel to Westminster. He made the journey on a poor lean horse, the route chosen being always the one whereby he could avoid turnpike tolls. He was known to put a hard-boiled egg in his pocket, and midway on his journey would sit under some hedge and eat his egg or sleep. After twelve years, he retired rather than face the prospect of laying out any money to retain his seat.

Moneylending
Despite his exceptional frugality, Elwes lost huge sums of money to his colleagues in unrepaid loans, uncollected debts and dubious investments. He believed that one did not ask a gentleman for money, regardless of the circumstances. On one notable occasion Elwes, unsolicited, lent Lord Abingdon £7,000 to enable him to place a bet at Newmarket. On the day of the race, Elwes rode on horseback to the racetrack with nothing to eat for fourteen hours save a piece of pancake which he had put into his pocket two months earlier and which he swore to a startled companion was "as good as new".

Later years

After his parliamentary career ended, Elwes devoted his full energies to being a miser as he moved about among his many properties. At his neglected estates he continued to forbid repairs, joined his tenants in postharvest gleaning, and sat with his servants in the kitchen to save the cost of a fire elsewhere. Even on the coldest day of winter he was known to sit fireless at his meals, saying that eating was "exercise enough" to keep him warm. If a stableboy put out hay for a visitor's horse, Elwes would sneak out and remove it. In his last years, he had no fixed abode and frequently shifted his residence between his unrented London properties in the neighbourhood of Marylebone seeking out the ones which were temporarily unoccupied. A couple of beds, a couple of chairs, a table, and an "old woman" (housekeeper) were said to be all his furnishings. This same housekeeper was known to frequently catch colds because there were never any fires and often no glass in the windows.

This practice nearly cost Elwes his life when he fell desperately ill in one of these houses and no one could find him. Only by chance was he rescued. His nephew, Colonel Timms, who wanted to see him, inquired in vain at Elwes's bankers and at other places. A pot boy recollected having seen an "old beggar" go into a stable at one of Elwes's uninhabited houses in Great Marlborough Street and lock the door behind him. Timms knocked at the door, but when no one answered, sent for a blacksmith and had the lock forced. According to author Edward Walford in Volume 4 of his "Old and New London" (1878):
"In the lower part (of the house) all was shut and silent, but on ascending the stairs they heard the moans of a person seemingly in distress. They went to the chamber, and there on an old pallet bed they found Mr. Elwes, apparently in the agonies of death. For some time he seemed quite insensible."

He remained in this condition until some "cordials" could be administered by a neighbouring apothecary. After he had sufficiently recovered, Elwes stated that he believed he had been ill for "two or three days", and that there was an "old woman" in the house, but for some reason or other, she had "not been near him"; that she had "been ill herself", but that he supposed she must have "recovered" and "gone away". Upon searching the premises, however, Timms and the apothecary found the woman stretched lifeless on the floor, having apparently been dead for two days.

Towards the end of his life, Elwes grew feverish and restless, hoarding small quantities of money in different places, continually visiting all the places of deposit to see that they were safe. He began suffering from delusion, fearing that he would die in poverty. In the night, he was heard struggling with imaginary robbers, crying: "I will keep my money! I will! Don't rob me! Oh, don't!" When asked who was there?, Elwes would reply: "Sir, I beg your pardon, my name is Elwes, I have been unfortunate enough to be robbed in this house, which I believe is mine, of all the money I have in the world of five guineas and a half, and half a crown." The family doctor was sent for, and, looking at the dying miser, was heard to remark: "That man, with his original strength of constitution, and lifelong habits of temperance, might have lived twenty years longer, but for his continual anxiety about money." Even his barrister, who drew up his £800,000 will, was forced to undertake his writings in the firelight by the dying man's bedside in order to save the cost of a candle.

Elwes was known to sleep in the same worn garments he wore during the day. He was discovered one morning between the sheets with his tattered shoes on his feet, an old torn hat on his head, and a stick in his hand. It was in this condition he died on 26 November 1789. His burial took place in Stoke-by-Clare. After having lived on only £50 a year, Elwes left £500,000 (Approx £74,207,558 as of 2018) to his two sons who were born out of wedlock, George and John, (whom he loved but would not educate, believing that "putting things into people's heads is the sure way to take money out of their pockets") and the rest to his nephew.

The following summary of his character by Edward Topham, his friend and biographer:
"his public character lives after him pure and without stain. In private life, he was chiefly an enemy to himself. To others, he lent much; to himself, he denied everything. But in the pursuit of his property, or in the recovery of it, I have it not in my remembrance one unkind thing that ever was done by him."

Besides being a member of Parliament, Elwes's accomplishments include financing the construction of a significant amount of Georgian London, including Portman Place, Portman Square, and parts of Oxford Circus, Piccadilly, Baker Street and Marylebone.

References

External links

 The life of the late John Elwes, Esquire by Edward Topham (1805 London ed.) at Internet Archive
 The life of the late John Elwes, Esquire by Edward Topham (1815 Poughkeepsie ed.) at Internet Archive
 The Lives and Portraits of Curious and Odd Characters at Internet Archive
 A visitation of the seats and arms of the noblemen and gentlemen of Great Britain by Bernard Burke at Google Books
 A Topographical and Historical Account of the Parish of St. Mary-le-Bone by Thomas Smith at Google Books
 Chest of Books
 The New York Public Library Digital Gallery
Chambers Book of Days
John Elwes at Google Docs

1714 births
1789 deaths
British MPs 1768–1774
British MPs 1774–1780
British MPs 1780–1784
Members of the Parliament of Great Britain for Berkshire
People from Vale of White Horse (district)
Charles Dickens
Misers